Godfred Agyemang Yeboah (born 24 June 1998) is a Ghanaian footballer who plays as an centre back for Ghana Premier League side Karela United FC, whom he captains.

Club career

Early career
Yeboah played at Obonu FC in 2012, Shaka FC in 2014 and Golden Boys FC 2015 during his formative period as a footballer.

Proud United 
Yeboah began his professional football career with Proud United FC in the 2015–2016 season.

Karela United
In January 2017, Ghana Premier League side Karela United FC signed Yeboah on a three-year contract from Proud United FC.

In October 2019, It was reported that Ghana Premier League giants Hearts of Oak SC were interested in his services but a transfer request was rejected by Karela United FC based on financial agreements. He was promoted from deputy captain to captain ahead of the 2020–21 season with Diawisie Taylor and Sadiq Alhassan serving as his deputies.

References

1998 births
Living people
Association football forwards
Ghanaian footballers
Ghana Premier League players
Karela United FC players
Association football defenders